Oil Refinery Elementary School is a station on the Red line of Kaohsiung MRT in Nanzih District, Kaohsiung, Taiwan.

The station is a four-level, elevated station with two side platforms and four exits. It is 134 metres long and is located at the intersection of Zuonan Rd and Houchang Rd.

Around the Station
 Oil Refinery Elementary School (Youchang Elementary School)
 Guoguang (Kuo Kwang) Laboratory School, National Sun Yat-sen University
 Kaohsiung Refinery Main Plant
 Refinery dormitory
 Guoguang New Village
 Yang Family Historical Residence
 Youchang Forest Park

References

External links
KRTC Oil Refinery Elementary School Station

2008 establishments in Taiwan
Kaohsiung Metro Red line stations
Railway stations opened in 2008